Diana Patience Beverly Ross (8 July 1910 – 4 May 2000) was an English children's author. A graduate of the Central School of Art in London, she also worked on sculpture and graphic arts and illustrated several of her own books under the name of her cat, Gri.

Life and work 
She was educated in Britain and in Paris, and read history at Girton College, Cambridge.

In her early twenties, Ross worked at the Grenfell Mission orphanage in St. Anthony, Newfoundland, and would later help Wilfred Grenfell to research his history, The Romance of Labrador, as well as – without credit – drawing the book's illustrations.

Beginning with The Little Red Engine Gets a Name (1942), followed by The Story of the Little Red Engine (1945) and seven more volumes, Ross created a series of picture books which followed the adventures of the same character. Jan Le Witt and George Him provided the illustrations for the first volume and Leslie Wood its sequels.

Ross had several of her short works read for BBC radio broadcasts for children, and wrote several volumes of modern fairy tales for older children. She also had an uncredited part in the creation of the BBC children's television series Camberwick Green.

Selected works 

 The Beetle who Lived Alone (London: Faber and Faber, 1941), illustrated by Margaret Kaye
 The Little Red Engine Gets a Name (London: Faber and Faber, 1942), illustrated by Lewitt and Him
 The Story of Louisa (Penguin, 1945), illustrated by Margaret Kaye
 The Story of the Little Red Engine (London: Faber and Faber, 1945), illustrated by Leslie Wood
 Whoo Whoo the Wind Blew (London: Faber and Faber, 1946), illustrated by Leslie Wood
 The Little Red Engine goes to Market (London: Faber and Faber, 1946), illustrated by Leslie Wood
 Ebenezer the Big Balloon (London: Faber and Faber), illustrated by Leslie Wood
 The Little Red Engine Goes to Town (London: Faber and Faber), illustrated by Leslie Wood
 William and the Lorry (London: Faber and Faber), illustrated by Shirley Hughes
 The Little Red Engine Goes Home (London: Faber and Faber), illustrated by Leslie Wood
 The Little Red Engine Goes Travelling (London: Faber and Faber), illustrated by Leslie Wood
 The Merry-Go-Round (Lutterworth Press, 1963), illustrated by Shirley Hughes
 Old Perisher (London: Faber and Faber, 1965), illustrated by Edward Ardizzone
 The Little Red Engine Goes to be Mended (London: Faber and Faber, 1966), illustrated by Leslie Wood
 The Little Red Engine and the Taddlecombe Outing (London: Faber and Faber, 1968), illustrated by Leslie Wood
 The Little Red Engine Goes Carolling (London: Faber and Faber, 1971), illustrated by Leslie Wood

References

External links
 Website on Diana Ross, made by her by son-in-law

1910 births
2000 deaths
Alumni of the Central School of Art and Design
English children's writers
English illustrators
People from Valletta
British expatriates in Malta